Saulgé is a commune in the Vienne department in the Nouvelle-Aquitaine region in central-western France. The village is located 50 km southeast of Poitiers and 80 km northwest of Limoges.

Population

See also
Communes of the Vienne department

References

Communes of Vienne